Christian Ludwig II of Mecklenburg (15 May 1683 – 30 May 1756) was the Duke of Mecklenburg-Schwerin from 1747 to 1756. He was the son of Frederick, Duke of Mecklenburg-Grabow, and Landravine Christine Wilhelmine of Hesse-Homburg.

Mecklenburg-Schwerin began its existence during a series of constitutional struggles between the duke and the nobles. The heavy debt incurred by Charles Leopold, who had joined Russian Empire in a war against Sweden, brought matters to a head; Charles VI interfered, and in 1728 the imperial court of justice declared the duke incapable of governing. His brother, Christian Ludwig II, was appointed administrator of the duchy. Under this prince, who became ruler de jure in 1747, the Convention of Rostock, by which a new constitution was framed for the duchy, was signed in April 1755. By this instrument, all power lay in the hands of the duke, the nobles, and the upper classes generally; the lower classes were entirely unrepresented.

In 1714, he married Duchess Gustave Caroline of Mecklenburg-Strelitz and had five children:
 Frederick II, Duke of Mecklenburg-Schwerin (1717–1785); married Duchess Louise Frederica of Württemberg (1722–1791)
 Ulrike Sofie (1723–1813) Abbess of the Rühn monastery
 Louis (1725–1778); married Charlotte Sophie of Saxe-Coburg-Saalfeld (1731–1810); they were the parents of Frederick Francis I, Grand Duke of Mecklenburg-Schwerin
 Luise (1730)
 Amalie (1732–1775) Canon of Herford

His household employed Johann Gottfried Müthel as an organist and cembalist, and Konrad Ekhof as a comedian.

1683 births
1756 deaths
Dukes of Mecklenburg-Schwerin
House of Mecklenburg-Schwerin
German landowners